Nobutaka Hirano (born December 5, 1972) is a former volleyball player from Ama, Aichi, Japan, who played for the Men's National Team in the 1990s. Nicknamed Heita he ended up in sixteenth place at the 1998 World Championship.

Honours 

1998 World Championship — 16th place

References 
 Profile

1972 births
Living people
Japanese men's volleyball players
Sportspeople from Aichi Prefecture
People from Ama, Aichi
20th-century Japanese people